is a Japanese seinen manga magazine that was published on a monthly basis by Wani Books between 1996 and 2015.

Unlike other Japanese magazines, Comic Gum rarely contains posters or pin-up pictures. However, a special gift is given away together with each issue, which is related to one of the series featured in the magazine. That includes Special DVDs, Trading Cards or Drama CDs.

Its main readership is men 18 years and up.

Manga serialized
99 (Ninetynine)
Ah My Buddha
Aika Zero
Ashiarai
Because I'm the Goddess
The Candidate for Goddess
Deep Forest
Emuyon
Fight Ippatsu! Jūden-chan!!
Heavens Gate
Hibi kore hai boku
Iincho
Ikki Tousen
Kikokeso
Kita e. ~Diamond Dust Drops~
Koe de Oshigoto!
Magallanica
Mahoromatic
Nobunaga!
Otogi Matsuri: Dark Offering
Saito-Kun Wa Esper Rashii
Tetragrammaton Labyrinth
Tsukuyomi: Moon Phase
Tokyo Little Gunners
U~min

References

External links
  

1996 establishments in Japan
2015 disestablishments in Japan
Defunct magazines published in Japan
Magazines established in 1996
Magazines disestablished in 2015
Magazines published in Tokyo
Monthly manga magazines published in Japan
Seinen manga magazines